The 1999 Argentine motorcycle Grand Prix was the last round of the 1999 Grand Prix motorcycle racing season. It took place on 31 October 1999 at the Autódromo Oscar Alfredo Gálvez in Buenos Aires.

500 cc classification

250 cc classification

125 cc classification

Championship standings after the race (500cc)

Below are the standings for the top five riders and constructors after round sixteen has concluded. 

Riders' Championship standings

Constructors' Championship standings

 Note: Only the top five positions are included for both sets of standings.

References

External links

Argentine Republic motorcycle Grand Prix
Argentine
Motorcycle Grand Prix